Garcinia wightii is a species of flowering plant in the family Clusiaceae. It is found only in India.

References

Endemic flora of India (region)
Vulnerable plants
wightii
Taxonomy articles created by Polbot